
Gmina Kościerzyna is a rural gmina (administrative district) in Kościerzyna County, Pomeranian Voivodeship, in northern Poland. Its seat is the town of Kościerzyna, although the town is not part of the territory of the gmina.

The gmina contains parts of the protected areas called Kashubian Landscape Park and Wdydze Landscape Park.

Villages
Gmina Kościerzyna contains the villages and settlements of Będominek, Czarlina, Czarne Pustkowie, Częstkowo, Dąbrówka, Dębogóry, Debrzyno, Dobrogoszcz, Fingrowa Huta, Garczyn, Gołuń, Gościeradz, Gostomie, Grzybowo, Grzybowski Młyn, Juszki, Kaliska Kościerskie, Kania, Kłobuczyno, Korne, Kościerska Huta, Kościerzyna-Wybudowanie, Kruszyna, Kula Młyn, Lizaki, Loryniec, Łubiana, Ludwikowo, Małe Stawiska, Mały Klincz, Mały Podleś, Niedamowo, Nowa Karczma, Nowa Kiszewa, Nowa Wieś Kościerska, Nowy Klincz, Nowy Podleś, Owśnice, Owśniczka, Piekło, Plon, Puc, Rotembark, Sarnowy, Skoczkowo, Skorzewo, Smolniki, Stawiska, Sycowa Huta, Szenajda, Szludron, Wąglikowice, Wawrzynowo, Wdzydze Kiszewskie, Wętfie, Wielki Klincz, Wielki Podleś, Wieprznica, Wierzysko, Wygoda, Zabrody, Zielenin and Złotowo.

Neighbouring gminas
Gmina Kościerzyna is bordered by the town of Kościerzyna and by the gminas of Dziemiany, Karsin, Liniewo, Lipusz, Nowa Karczma, Somonino, Stara Kiszewa, Stężyca and Sulęczyno.

References
Polish official population figures 2006

Koscierzyna
Kościerzyna County